Fabasoft AG is a software manufacturer headquartered in Linz, Upper Austria. The company was established in 1988 by Helmut Fallmann and Leopold Bauernfeind.

The name Fabasoft is an acronym of Fallmann Bauernfeind Software.

Corporate data 
The fiscal year of Fabasoft AG commences on April 1. The number of employees at the respective reporting date, March 31, has increased over recent years, from 100 staff in 2003 to 185 (in 2004) and 203 (2005).  Corporate revenue also increased from EUR 16.94 million in the 2003/2004 fiscal year to EUR 21.85 million (in 2004/2005) and EUR 25.3 million during the 2005/2006 fiscal year. During the 2006/2007 fiscal year, the revenue decreased to EUR 21.2 million, EUR 21.6 million were recorded during the 2007/2008 fiscal year, and during 2008/2009 Fabasoft AG recorded a revenue of EUR 20.02 million. In the fiscal year 2009/2010 sales revenue was EUR 23.3 million. Fabasoft AG stocks have been listed in the Prime Standard of the Frankfurt stock exchange since October 4, 1999. Fabasoft is certified according to the ISO 9001, ISO 20000, ISO 27001 and SAS 70 Type II. Fabasoft Cloud is also listed as compliant with the EU Cloud Code of Conduct, an approved GDPR Code of Conduct for Cloud Services, being the first company reaching Compliance Level 3.

Since 2012, Fabasoft is a participant in the United Nations Global Compact that commits CEOs to sustainability and broader UN-related goals.

Stockholders 
 Fallmann & Bauernfeind Privatstiftung: 53.80% 
 Axxion S.A.: 6.21%

References

External links 
 Official Website
 Official Website ISO/IEC 20000 Listings - Austria

Austrian companies established in 1988
Cloud computing providers
Companies based in Linz
Economy of Upper Austria
Software companies established in 1988
Software companies of Austria